The 3.7 cm Flak 18/36/37 was a series of anti-aircraft guns produced by Nazi Germany that saw widespread service in the Second World War. The cannon was fully automatic and effective against aircraft flying at altitudes up to 4,200 m. The cannon was produced in both towed and self-propelled versions. Having a flexible doctrine, the Germans used their anti-aircraft pieces in ground support roles as well; 37 mm caliber guns were no exception to that. With Germany's defeat, production ceased and, overall, 37 mm caliber anti-aircraft cannon fell into gradual disuse, being replaced by the Bofors 40 mm gun and later, by 35-mm anti-aircraft pieces produced in Switzerland.

Development
The original 37 mm gun was developed by Rheinmetall in 1935 as the 3.7 cm Flak 18. The cannon had an overall length of 89 calibers (hence the additional designation L/89), which allowed  maximum ceiling. The armour penetration was considerable when using dedicated ammunition, at 100 m distance it could penetrate 36 mm of a 60°-sloped armour, and at 800 m distance correspondingly 24 mm. It used a mechanical bolt for automatic fire, featuring a practical rate of fire of about 80 rounds per minute (rpm).

The Flak 18 was only produced in small numbers, and production had already ended in 1936. The gun's ballistic characteristics were not changed, although the practical rate of fire was raised to 120 rpm (250 rpm theoretical). A new, simplified sighting system introduced the next year produced the otherwise-identical 3.7 cm Flak 37. The Flak 37 was known as 37 ITK 37 in Finland.

The Flak 36/37 were the most-produced variants of the weapon.

Tun antiaerian Rheinmetall calibru 37 mm model 1939
In 1938, the Kingdom of Romania acquired the license to locally produce 360 guns, officially known as "Tun antiaerian Rheinmetall calibru 37 mm model 1939" ("37 mm Rheinmetall anti-aircraft cannon model 1939") at the Astra Works in Brașov. By May 1941, 102 guns had been delivered. The production rate was of 6 pieces per month as of October 1942.

Aviation version

 
The earlier Flak 18 version of the 37mm autoloading gun was adapted for aviation use as the BK 3,7, the lightest-calibre model of the Bordkanone series of heavy caliber cannon used in Luftwaffe aircraft during the war. The BK 3,7 was usually employed for strike against ground targets, or for bomber destroyer duties. Mounted within self-contained gun pods or in conformal gondola-style flat-surface mounted gunpod housings, the BK 3,7 saw use on the Ju 87G panzerknacker ("tank-cracker") version of the Stuka dive bomber as flown with considerable success by Hans-Ulrich Rudel, the Ju 88P-2 and P-3 subtypes, and the Hs 129 B-2/R3 twin-engined strike aircraft.

Similar weapons
The closest Allied counterpart to the 3.7 cm Flak series was the 40 mm Bofors L/60, which was designated the "4 cm Flak 28" in German service. Firing rates for the earlier models were similar, although the Flak 43's improved rates beat the Bofors.

The 37 mm automatic air defense gun M1939 (61-K) was the closest Soviet counterpart, firing a shell very similar to the Flak from a gun of generally similar weight and size. The 37, however, had a much lower cyclic rate, averaging around 80 rpm (that was in fact the practical firing rate, the cyclic rate was 160-170 rpm). The US's 37 mm Gun M1 was similar to the Flak as well, but was considered inferior to the Bofors and saw relatively limited use. The Japanese had nothing similar, their largest AA autocannon being the Type 96 25 mm AT/AA Gun. The Italian counterpart was the Breda Cannone-Mitragliera da 37/54.

Comparison of anti-aircraft guns

See also
3.7 cm Flak 43

Notes

Sources

 Gander, Terry and Chamberlain, Peter. Weapons of the Third Reich: An Encyclopedic Survey of All Small Arms, Artillery and Special Weapons of the German Land Forces 1939-1945. New York: Doubleday, 1979 
 Hogg, Ian. Twentieth-Century Artillery. New York: Barnes & Noble Books, 2000.  Pg.107
 Hogg, Ian V. German Artillery of World War Two. 2nd corrected edition. Mechanicsville, PA: Stackpole Books, 1997 

World War II artillery of Germany
World War II anti-aircraft guns
Anti-aircraft guns of Germany
37 mm artillery
Rheinmetall
Military equipment introduced in the 1930s